2011 DEKALB Superspiel may refer to one of the following:
2011 DEKALB Superspiel (March), the bonspiel held in March 2011 as part of the 2010–11 curling season
2011 DEKALB Superspiel (November), the bonspiel held in November 2011 as part of the 2011–12 curling season